A swan boat is a very long and narrow human-powered boat used in the team paddling sport of swan boat racing. It is similar to dragon boat and is mainly practiced in Thailand.  Swan boats are round-bottomed boats.  They come in several lengths that hold 20, 40, and 60 paddlers in a side-by-side configuration.

See also
Dragon boat

Nouka Baich

Waka (canoe)

War canoe
Chundan vallam

External links
American Swan Boat Association
Dragon Boat Net

Ships of Thailand
Canoes